Aron Rono (born 1 November 1982) is a Kenyan American long-distance runner. After completing a high school in Kenya he moved to the United States, where he graduated in political sciences from the Azusa Pacific University in 2009. As a member of the U.S. Army World Class Athlete Program he won a silver medal in the 10,000 m event at the 2015 Pan American Games.

References

1982 births
Living people
American male long-distance runners
Pan American Games medalists in athletics (track and field)
Pan American Games silver medalists for the United States
Azusa Pacific University alumni
Athletes (track and field) at the 2015 Pan American Games
Medalists at the 2015 Pan American Games